Barbodes cataractae is a species of cyprinid endemic to the Philippines where it is known from the Cascade River and the brackish waters of Murcielagos Bay in Mindanao.  This species is commercially important.

References

cataractae
Fish described in 1934
Taxonomy articles created by Polbot